Fernando Jiménez may refer to:

 Fernando Jiménez (cyclist) (born 1949), Argentine Olympic cyclist
 Fernando Jiménez (sport shooter), Puerto Rican Olympic shooter
 Fernando Volio Jiménez (1924–1996), Costa Rican politician